Violettas Puppenbühne  is a theatre in Wegberg, North Rhine-Westphalia, Germany.

Theatres in North Rhine-Westphalia
Heinsberg (district)